Pokemón is a subculture among Chile's youth that surfaced in the mid-2000s and began to decline in late 2009.
By 2012, it was considered extinct. They were readily identifiable by their angular and pressed hairstyles, reminiscent of characters from the Japanese media franchise Pokémon. It was one of the largest and better known urban tribes in the country.

Pokemones dressed similarly to other urban tribes, such as otaku and emo; Pokemón is the fusion of otaku and flaite, but they were not actually followers of anime like the former, and did not share the musical tastes of the latter. Apart from borrowing aspects from the emo, like the sideswept bangs, the Pokemones also shared some aspects typical to the punk and the local "hardcore" subculture. Pokemones were livelier, more extroverted than the emo and otaku stereotypes. Most Pokemones were teens. During parties they danced to reggaeton music, while kissing and groping with as many people (male or female) as they could, which they called poncear. They made extensive use of the Internet, trading photos of themselves on image-sharing site Fotolog and communicating through MSN Messenger.

Pokemones were usually from the Chilean middle and lower class. They were frequently juxtaposed against another group, the so-called peloláis, well-to-do girls with long, straight, fairer hair from private, Catholic schools.

In January 2008, Internet messages surfaced urging violence against Pokemones (mainly because of borrowing aspects from other subcultures, such as emo hair, hip-hop clothes, and for using the c-walk). People belonging to the subculture increasingly began to be attacked outside discos and pubs. In response, a joint anti-violence campaign called "Foundation for a Better Future" was organized by the Chilean government and Santiago's main student leaders.

See also
Flaite
Flogger, a contemporary Argentine youth culture

References

Further reading
 
 
 Sexo oral en la plaza: escándalo por el video de adolescentes de colegio católico en Internet
 

Fashion aesthetics
Social groups
Spanish slang
Stereotypes
Chilean youth culture
Chilean fashion
2000s in Chile